Léon Jonathan was a 19th-century French playwright and chansonnier.

Biography 
His plays were presented at the Théâtre Beaumarchais and the Théâtre du Château-d'Eau. He met great success with his plays Pierre Vaux, l'instituteur  and Carnot, a 5-act drama given on the stage of the Théâtre de l'Ambigu in 1884. Then no further mention of him is known. It is possible, judging by the contentious parts of his plays that the name was a non yet elucidated pseudonym.

Works 
1880 Le Ménétrier de Meudon, opéra comique in 3 acts, with Gaston Marot, music by Germain Laurens
1881: La Convention nationale, drama in 6 acts and 8 tableaux
1882: Pierre Vaux, l'instituteur, drama in 5 acts and 7 tableaux, with Louis Péricaud
1884: Déjeuner du jour de l'an, comédie en vaudeville in 1 act, with Charles Desmarest
1884: Carnot, drama in 5 acts, with Henri Blondeau and William Busnach
undated: Le Réveil du pauvre homme, song

Bibliography 
 Les milles et une nuits du théâtre, vol.9, 1894, (p. 203) (analyse de la pièce Pierre Vaux, l'instituteur)
 Philippe Chauveau, Les théâtres parisiens disparus: 1402-1986, 1999, (p. 144-145)

References 

19th-century French dramatists and playwrights